Greenock is a town in Inverclyde, Scotland, United Kingdom.

Greenock can also refer to:

In Scotland
Greenock Academy, a former school in Greenock
Greenock Blitz, the attack on the town of Greenock, Scotland by the Luftwaffe in May 1941
Greenock Dockyard Company, a shipbuilding firm
Easter Greenock Castle, a demolished castle
Greenock Morton FC, a Scottish football team
Greenock Telegraph, a local newspaper serving Inverclyde
Greenock (UK Parliament constituency), a former constituency of the British House of Commons 
Greenock and Port Glasgow (UK Parliament constituency), a former constituency of the British House of Commons 
Greenock and Inverclyde (Scottish Parliament constituency), a constituency of the Scottish Parliament
Greenock (HM Prison), a facility in the Scottish Prisons Service
Greenock Water, a river in East Ayrshire

Other places
Australia
Greenock, South Australia, a town in the Barossa Valley

Canada
Greenock Township, Ontario, a historic township in Brockton, Ontario

United States
Greenock, Pennsylvania, a census designated place in Allegheny County, Pennsylvania

Other uses
Lord Greenock, a courtesy title held by Earl Cathcart
Greenockite, a cadmium mineral